Night of Terror  is a 1933 horror film.

Night of Terror or A Night of Terror may also refer to:

Night of Terror - November 14, 1917, a night at the Occoquan Workhouse in Virginia, in which suffragist prisoners were beaten and abused
Montreal's night of terror a 1969 unrest in Montreal, Quebec during a Montreal police strike
A Night of Terror (1911 film), directed by Edwin S. Porter
A Night of Terror, alternative title for Love from a Stranger (1937 film)
Night of Terror (1972 TV film), starring Martin Balsam, Catherine Burns, Chuck Connors & Donna Mills
Night of Terror (2006 film), directed by William Tannen
"Night of Terror", an instrumental by Clint Mansell from the Black Swan soundtrack (2010)

See also
Riot (1996 film),  directed by Joseph Merhi released in the United States as Night of Terror
Night Terror (disambiguation)
Rats: Night of Terror
Terror by Night
A Night of Terror (disambiguation)